William Vaux may refer to:
 William Vaux, 3rd Baron Vaux of Harrowden, English peer
 William Sansom Vaux, American mineralogist
 William Sandys Wright Vaux, English antiquary and numismatist